In Gallo-Roman religion, Ambisagrus was a Gaulish god worshipped at Aquileia in Cisalpine Gaul, where he was identified with Jupiter Optimus Maximus.

The name may be composed of the Proto-Celtic prefix *ambi- ('around') and root *sagro-.

Notes

References
 Peter Berresford Ellis, Dictionary of Celtic Mythology(Oxford Paperback Reference), Oxford University Press, (1994): 
Juliette Wood, The Celts: Life, Myth, and Art, Thorsons Publishers (2002): 

Gaulish gods
Thunder gods
Jovian deities